S Stock may refer to either of the following London Underground's suburban stock:
 London Underground S Stock (ex-Metropolitan Railway)
 London Underground S7 and S8 Stock